Bungus may refer to:

 Bungu people, of Tanzania
 Bungus Bay, south of Padang in West Sumatra
 Pietro Bongo (died 1601), Latinized as Petrus Bungus, an Italian writer

See also 
 Bungu (disambiguation)